John Fredriksen (born 10 May 1944) is a Norwegian-born Cypriot oil tanker and shipping billionaire businessman based in London. He owns the world's largest oil tanker fleet and has major interests in the offshore driller Seadrill, the fish farming company Mowi, the dry bulk company Golden Ocean Group, and the supply vessel company Deep Sea Supply. Through his investment companies Hemen Holdings and Meisha, Fredriksen controls the companies Frontline and Golar LNG. In 2010–2011, Frontline owned 9.6 percent of another large tanker company, Overseas Shipholding Group. North Atlantic Drilling, Sevan Drilling, and Asia Offshore Drilling are partly owned by Seadrill.

Born in Oslo, Norway, Fredriksen is now a naturalised Cypriot citizen. Before abandoning his Norwegian citizenship, he was Norway's richest man. Norwegian magazine Kapital listed Fredriksen in 2013 with a net worth of NOK 69,75 billion (11.9 billion). In 2012, he was included in the 50 Most Influential list of Bloomberg Markets Magazine. He was named in the top 10 most influential people in the shipping industry according to Lloyds List 2014.

Biography

Family 
Fredriksen was born on 10 May 1944 to a welder and his wife, and grew up in Etterstad, in the eastern half of Oslo.

Fredriksen is a widower and has two twin daughters: Cecilie and Kathrine Astrup Fredriksen (both born 1983). Fredriksen's late wife, dentist Inger Astrup Fredriksen (died 2006), originally belonged to one of the Astrup families in Norway. Her father was a professor of psychiatry, and her grand uncle was the painter Nikolai Astrup.

Business 
Frederiksen first got into oil trading in the 1960s in Beirut, Lebanon, before buying his first tankers in the 1970s. He made his fortune during the Iran–Iraq War in the 1980s, when his tankers picked up oil at great risk and huge profits. As described by his biographer, "he was the lifeline to the Ayatollah." Fredriksen would later become the world's largest tanker owner, with more than seventy oil tankers and major interests in oil rigs and fish farming. His fleet is dominated by costly double-hulled, environmentally safer tankers.

In 2006, Seadrill bought more than 50 percent of Smedvig, gaining control of the company (51.24 percent of the votes and 52.27 percent of the capital). Smedvig is Fredriksen's biggest ever deal. Noble Corp sold its stake to Seadrill in 2009, leaving Seadrill with full control. Fredriksen has been the majority owner of Vålerenga I.F. for many years.

Fortune 
The Sunday Times Rich List has ranked Fredriksen's wealth as £475m (2003), £1.050b (2004) and £1.887b (2005). In 2012, Fredriksen and his family were listed as the 9th richest in Britain with a combined wealth of £6.6bn. Fredriksen owns houses in London, Oslo, Cyprus, and Marbella, Spain. His house The Old Rectory in London has been estimated to be worth around US$172 million. He is a collector of classic Norwegian art.

Philanthropy 
Fredriksen claims to support research projects at The Radium Hospital and to have donated several hundreds of millions of Norwegian kroner to medical research at hospitals in Norway.

Gard case 
In 1985, the Norwegian insurance company Gard became suspicious about losses of cargo from Fredriksen's tankers. A private investigation was initiated, and a system for the use of heavy oil as bunker fuel was revealed. The case was turned over to the Norwegian police and in June 1986 Fredriksen's offices in Oslo were searched and several of his nearest associates, and after a while also Fredriksen, were placed in detention while the case was investigated.

After several years of arguments between the various lawyers, the case was settled out of court. Fredriksen had to pay a fine of 2 million NOK for risking his crew's lives, and in addition had to pay the insurance company Gard an amount of over 800,000.

References

Literature 
 Hauge, Odd Harald and Gunnar Stavrum. Storeulv, en uautorisert biografi om John Fredriksen. Oslo: Gyldendal, 2005. . Print.

1944 births
Cypriot billionaires
20th-century Cypriot businesspeople
Living people
Norwegian businesspeople in shipping
Norwegian emigrants to Cyprus
Businesspeople from Oslo
Norwegian people of Danish descent
Cypriot people of Norwegian descent
Naturalized citizens of Cyprus
People who lost Norwegian citizenship
Conservatism in Norway